is a 1962 Japanese chanbara film directed by Kenji Misumi and based on the 1948 essay of the same name by Kan Shimozawa. It is the first installment in a long-running jidaigeki film series starring Shintaro Katsu as the blind swordsman Zatoichi.

Plot
The blind masseur Zatoichi is hired as muscle for the yakuza Sukegoro (Eijiro Yanagi) as he thinks that war is inevitable with his rival Shigezo (Ryuzo Shimada). Zatoichi has a distinguished reputation as a swordsman and Sukegoro thinks that purchasing his services is money well spent. Shigezo responds by hiring a ronin of similar repute, Miki Hirate (Shigeru Amachi). 

Ichi presents himself as a meek, humble man and is commonly underestimated and looked upon suspiciously. His being a masseur, which was a position of low regard in feudal Japan, merely increases the hostility that is shown towards him. One notable scene has Ichi playing dice in a gambling den where the dealer attempts to con him with loaded pieces. Ichi demonstrates the extent to which he has mastered his other senses by noticing that the dice have a different sound and calling out the gamblers for tricking him.

The only person who respects him is Hirate, who as a ronin understands what it feels like to be an outcast. Though Hirate and Ichi know they must fight when the war begins, they develop a sense of friendship. Hirate is eager to fight Zatoichi, as he is terminally ill with tuberculosis and wishes to die fighting. As Hirate becomes increasingly sick, Sukegoro takes advantage by ordering an all-out attack on Shigezo and removing Ichi from his payroll. 

Hirate learns that Shigezo intends to kill Ichi anyway by sniping him with a tanegashima. The dying warrior drags himself from his bed and pledges to kill Ichi in an honorable manner. Ichi learns from a boy at the temple where Hirate was staying of his intentions, and also learns the reason. After the tense final fight, in which Zatoichi prevails and cuts Hirate down, he rejects the advances of the yakuza mistress Otane (Masayo Banri), who has become disillusioned with her lifestyle, to continue as a solitary wanderer.

Cast
 Shintaro Katsu as Zatoichi
 Masayo Banri as Otane 
 Ryūzō Shimada as Shigezo of the Sasagawa Yakuza
 Gen Mitamura as Hanji of Matsugishi
 Shigeru Amachi as Miki Hirate
 Chitose Maki as Hanji's wife Yoshi
 Ikuko Mōri as Shigezo's wife Oyutaka
 Michio Minami as Tatekichi of the Iioka Yakuza
 Eijirō Yanagi as Sukegoro of Iioka
 Toshio Chiba as Masakichi of Iioka
 Manabu Morita as Seisuke of Iioka
 Yoichi Funaki as Yogoro of Sasagawa
 Kin'ya Ichikawa as Mokichi of Sasagawa
 Eigorō Onoe as Rihei of Sasagawa
 Yoshito Yamaji as Tatekichi's father Yahei
 Yukio Horikita as Kanaji of Sasagawa
 Ryūji Fukui as Daihachi of Iioka

Release
The Tale of Zatoichi was released in Japan on April 12, 1962. It was re-issued theatrically in 1976. The film was followed by The Tale of Zatoichi Continues later in 1962.

Reception
The film received positive reviews earning 100% from review aggregator Rotten Tomatoes according to 7 reviews. The film summoned the most sequels of a samurai film and has also spawned a remake in 2003.

References

Footnotes

Sources

External links
 

1962 films
1960s adventure films
Japanese adventure films
1960s Japanese-language films
Japanese black-and-white films
Zatoichi films
Jidaigeki films
Samurai films
Yakuza films
Daiei Film films
Films directed by Kenji Misumi
Films scored by Akira Ifukube
Films about blind people
1960s Japanese films